Euciodálcio Gomes (born 22 May 1996), known as Dálcio, is a professional footballer who plays as an attacking midfielder for Cypriot First Division club APOEL. Born in Portugal, he represents the Guinea-Bissau national team.

Club career
On 18 January 2015, Dálcio made his professional debut with Belenenses in a 2014–15 Primeira Liga match against Gil Vicente.

In the 2015–16 season he joined defending champions Benfica, but stayed at Belenenses on a one-year loan deal. In January 2016, he returned to Benfica, joining its reserve team in the Segunda Liga.

On 6 June 2017, Dálcio joined Scottish Premiership side Rangers on a season-long loan deal. He made his debut for Rangers against Progrès Niederkorn in the first qualifying round of Europa League on 29 June 2017, and also featured in the second leg on 4 July. He made his only league appearance for Rangers after coming on in added time against Hamilton Academical in a 4–1 away win on 29 September.

After a loan to Belenenses SAD for the 2018–19 season, Dálcio made a permanent move from Benfica to Panetolikos in Superleague Greece. On 25 August 2019, he scored his first goal in a 2–1 away loss against PAOK.

On 3 July 2021, he joined Ionikos FC on a free transfer.

International career
Born in Portugal, Dálcio is of Bissau-Guinean descent. He was called up to represent the Guinea-Bissau national team for a pair of friendlies in March 2022. He debuted with Guinea-Bissau in a friendly 3–0 win over Equatorial Guinea on 23 March 2022.

Club statistics

References

External links
 Stats and profile at LPFP
 
 
 
 

1996 births
Living people
Sportspeople from Almada
Bissau-Guinean footballers
Guinea-Bissau international footballers
Portuguese footballers
Portugal youth international footballers
Portuguese sportspeople of Bissau-Guinean descent
Citizens of Guinea-Bissau through descent
Association football forwards
Rangers F.C. players
Panetolikos F.C. players
Ionikos F.C. players
Scottish Professional Football League players
Super League Greece players
Sporting CP footballers
C.F. Os Belenenses players
S.L. Benfica B players
Belenenses SAD players
Primeira Liga players
Liga Portugal 2 players
Bissau-Guinean expatriate footballers
Bissau-Guinean expatriate sportspeople in Scotland
Expatriate footballers in Scotland
Bissau-Guinean expatriate sportspeople in Greece
Expatriate footballers in Greece
Portuguese expatriate footballers
Portuguese expatriate sportspeople in Scotland
Portuguese expatriate sportspeople in Greece